The Museum of the History of Medicine is a medical museum in the 6th arrondissement of Paris, France. It is located at 12 rue de l'École de Médecine, on the second floor of the historic École de Chirurgie (nowadays Paris Descartes University).

See also
 List of museums in Paris
 List of medical museums

Notes

External links

 Museum of the History of Medicine

Museums in Paris
Medical museums in France
University museums in France
Buildings and structures in the 6th arrondissement of Paris